Dimethyl sulfate (DMS) is a chemical compound with formula (CH3O)2SO2. As the diester of methanol and sulfuric acid, its formula is often written as (CH3)2SO4 or Me2SO4, where CH3 or Me is methyl.  Me2SO4 is mainly used as a methylating agent in organic synthesis.

Me2SO4 is a colourless oily liquid with a slight onion-like odour (although smelling it would represent significant exposure). Like all strong alkylating agents, Me2SO4 is extremely toxic. Its use as a laboratory reagent has been superseded to some extent by methyl triflate, CF3SO3CH3, the methyl ester of trifluoromethanesulfonic acid.

History
Dimethyl sulfate was discovered in the early 19th century in an impure form.  J. P. Claesson later extensively studied its preparation.

It was investigated as a candidate for possible use in chemical warfare in World War I in 75% to 25% mixture with methyl chlorosulfonate (CH3ClO3S) called "C-stoff" in Germany, or with chlorosulfonic acid called "Rationite" in France.

Production
Dimethyl sulfate can be synthesized in the laboratory by several methods, the simplest being the esterification of sulfuric acid with methanol:
2 CH3OH + H2SO4 → (CH3)2SO4  +  2 H2O
At higher temperatures, dimethyl sulfate decomposes.

The reaction of methyl nitrite and methyl chlorosulfonate also results in dimethyl sulfate:
CH3ONO + (CH3)OSO2Cl → (CH3)2SO4 + NOCl

Dimethyl sulfate has been produced commercially since the 1920s.  A common process is the continuous reaction of dimethyl ether with sulfur trioxide.
(CH3)2O + SO3 → (CH3)2SO4

Reactions and uses
Dimethyl sulfate is a reagent for the methylation of phenols, amines, and thiols.  One methyl group is transferred more quickly than the second.  Methyl transfer is assumed to occur via an SN2 reaction. Compared to other methylating agents, dimethyl sulfate is preferred by the industry because of its low cost and high reactivity.

Methylation at oxygen
Commonly Me2SO4 is employed to methylate phenols.  Some simple alcohols are also suitably methylated, as illustrated by the conversion of tert-butanol to t-butyl methyl ether:
2 (CH3)3COH  + (CH3O)2SO2   →  2 (CH3)3COCH3  +  H2SO4
Alkoxide salts are rapidly methylated:
RO− Na+ + (CH3O)2SO2 → ROCH3 + Na(CH3)SO4

The methylation of sugars is called Haworth methylation.

Methylation at amine nitrogen
Me2SO4 is used to prepare both quaternary ammonium salts or tertiary amines:
C6H5CH=NC4H9 + (CH3O)2SO2   →  C6H5CH=N+(CH3)C4H9  +  CH3OSO3−
Quaternized fatty ammonium compounds are used as  a surfactant or fabric softeners.  Methylation to create a tertiary amine is illustrated as:
CH3(C6H4)NH2 + (CH3O)2SO2 (in NaHCO3 aq.) → CH3(C6H4)N(CH3)2 + Na(CH3)SO4

Methylation at sulfur
Similar to the methylation of alcohols, mercaptide salts are easily methylated by Me2SO4:
RS−Na+  +  (CH3O)2SO2  →  RSCH3  +  Na(CH3)SO4
An example is:
p-CH3C6H4SO2Na + (CH3O)2SO2 → p-CH3C6H4SO2CH3 + Na(CH3)SO4
This method has been used to prepare thioesters:
RC(O)SH + (CH3O)2SO2 → RC(O)S(CH3) + HOSO3CH3

Reactions with nucleic acids
Dimethyl sulfate (DMS) is used to determine the secondary structure of RNA. At neutral pH, DMS methylates unpaired adenine and cytosine residues at their canonical Watson-Crick faces, but it cannot methylate base-paired nucleotides. Using the method known as DMS-MaPseq, RNA is incubated with DMS to methylate unpaired bases. Then the RNA is reverse-transcribed; the reverse transcriptase frequently adds an incorrect DNA base when it encounters a methylated RNA base. These mutations can be detected via sequencing, and the RNA is inferred to be single-stranded at bases with above-background mutation rates.

Dimethyl sulfate can effect the base-specific cleavage of DNA by attacking the imidazole rings present in guanine. Dimethyl sulfate also methylates adenine in single-stranded portions of DNA (e.g., those with proteins like RNA polymerase progressively melting and re-annealing the DNA). Upon re-annealing, these methyl groups interfere with adenine-guanine base-pairing. Nuclease S1 can then be used to cut the DNA in single-stranded regions (anywhere with a methylated adenine). This is an important technique for analyzing protein-DNA interactions.

Alternatives 
Although dimethyl sulfate is highly effective and affordable,  its toxicity has encouraged the use of other methylating reagents. Methyl iodide is a reagent used for O-methylation, like dimethyl sulfate, but is less hazardous and more expensive. Dimethyl carbonate, which is less reactive, has far lower toxicity compared to both dimethyl sulfate and methyl iodide. High pressure can be used to accelerate methylation by dimethyl carbonate. In general, the toxicity of methylating agents is correlated with their efficiency as methyl transfer reagents.

Safety
Dimethyl sulfate is carcinogenic and mutagenic, highly poisonous, corrosive, and environmentally hazardous. It is absorbed through the skin, mucous membranes, and gastrointestinal tract, and can cause a fatal delayed respiratory tract reaction. An ocular reaction is also common. There is no strong odor or immediate irritation to warn of lethal concentration in the air. The LD50 (acute, oral) is 205 mg/kg (rat) and 140 mg/kg (mouse), and LC50 (acute) is 45 ppm / 4 hours (rat). The vapor pressure of 65 Pa is sufficiently large to produce a lethal concentration in air by evaporation at 20 °C. Delayed toxicity allows potentially fatal exposures to occur prior to development of any warning symptoms. Symptoms may be delayed 6–24 hours. Concentrated solutions of bases (ammonia, alkalis) can be used to hydrolyze minor spills and residues on contaminated equipment, but the reaction may become violent with larger amounts of dimethyl sulfate (see ICSC). Although the compound hydrolyses, treatment with water cannot be assumed to decontaminate it.

References

External links 
 WebBook page for C2H6SO4
 International Chemic

Methyl esters
Methylating agents
IARC Group 2A carcinogens
Sulfate esters